Hugo Åbergs Memorial is an annual Group One harness event for trotters that is held at Jägersro Racetrack in Malmö, Sweden. Hugo Åbergs Memorial has taken place since 1970. In 2008, the purse of the event was approximately US$291,000 (SEK1,750,000). Hugo Åbergs Memorial is part of the European Grand Circuit.

Origin
Hugo Åbergs Memorial was inaugurated in 1970 to commemorate Hugo Åberg, who had died in a car accident the previous year. Åberg was a significant building contractor, responsible for many building projects in Malmö, as well as a horse racing devotee.

Racing conditions
Since the start in 1970, Hugo Åbergs Memorial has been almost exclusively over 1,609 meters, one mile. The two exceptions are the editions of 1971 and 1972, when the race was nine meters shorter, i.e. 1,600 meters. Auto start has been used all years but 1971 and 1977, when volt start was used instead.

The event is invitational, meaning only invited horses can participate.

Past winners

Horses with most wins
 2 - Express Gaxe (1979, 1980)
 2 - Big Spender (1986, 1987)
 2 - Peace Corps (1990, 1991)
 2 - Rite On Line (1997, 1998)
 2 - Gidde Palema (2004, 2005)

Drivers with most wins
 7 - Stig H. Johansson
 3 - Åke Svanstedt
 2 - Jean-Michel Bazire
 2 - Olle Goop
 2 - Per-Olof Gustafsson
 2 - Atle Hamre
 2 - Berth Johansson

Trainers with most wins
 8 - Stig H. Johansson
 3 - Åke Svanstedt
 2 - Per-Olof Gustafsson
 2 - Atle Hamre
 2 - Berth Johansson

Sires with at least two winning offsprings
 3 - Tibur (Mustard, Big Spender, Callit)
 2 - Biesolo (Giesolo de Lou, Oiseau de Feux)
 2 - Nevele Pride (Pershing, U.S. Thor Viking)
 2 - Quick Pay (The Onion, Victory Tilly)

Winner with lowest odds
 Winning odds: 1.07 - Varenne (2002)

Winner with highest odds
 Winning odds: 43.17 - Atout du Moulin (1971)

Fastest winners

Auto start
 1:09.7 (km rate) - L'Amiral Mauzun (2008)

Volt start
 1:16.3 (km rate) - Duke Iran (1977)

All winners of Hugo Åbergs Memorial

See also
 List of Scandinavian harness horse races

References

External links
 Jägersro Racetrack official homepage

Harness races in Sweden